German submarine U-7 was a Type IIB U-boat of Nazi Germany's Kriegsmarine, based out of Kiel during World War II. It was one of the smaller versions, and was first launched on 29 June 1935 with a crew of 29. Its first commander was Kurt Freiwald. U-7 would have 16 commanders over the course of its service, the last being Günther Loeschcke.

During the war U-7 was responsible for sinking two vessels.

On 18 February 1944, west of Pillau, U-7 sank in what is believed to have been a malfunction during a diving manoeuvre. There were no survivors.

Design
German Type IIB submarines were enlarged versions of the original Type IIs. U-7 had a displacement of  when at the surface and  while submerged. She had two shafts and two  propellers.

U-7 was fitted with three  torpedo tubes at the bow, five torpedoes or up to twelve Type A torpedo mines, and a  anti-aircraft gun. The boat had a complement of twentyfive.

Service history

U-7 was ordered on 20 July 1934, i.e. in violation of the Versailles Treaty, which denied Germany possession of submarines. The U-boat was not laid down until 11 March 1935, and launched on 29 June 1935, within weeks of the Anglo-German Naval Agreement, which granted Germany parity with the British Empire in submarines.

Commissioned on 18 July 1935 with Kapitänleutnant Kurt Freiwald in command, U-7 mainly served as a training boat except for two brief deployments during the Invasion of Poland in 1939 and Operation Weserübung in 1940.

On 18 February 1944, west of Pillau, U-7 sank in what is believed to have been a malfunction during a diving manoeuvre. There were no survivors.

Summary of raiding history

References

Bibliography

External links

German Type II submarines
U-boats commissioned in 1935
U-boats sunk in 1944
World War II submarines of Germany
World War II shipwrecks in the Baltic Sea
1935 ships
Ships built in Kiel
U-boat lost in diving accidents
Ships lost with all hands
Maritime incidents in February 1944